Beatrice Grasso (born 24 November 1995) is an Italian female canoeist who won two medals at senior level at the Wildwater Canoeing World Championships.

References

External links
 Beatrice Grasso at ICF 

1995 births
Living people
Italian female canoeists
Sportspeople from Venice
21st-century Italian women